The 1892 Penn State football team was an American football team that represented Pennsylvania State College—now known as Pennsylvania State University–as an independent during the 1892 college football season. The team was coached by George Hoskins and played its home games on the Old Main lawn in University Park, Pennsylvania.

Schedule

References

Penn State
Penn State Nittany Lions football seasons
Penn State football